Beswick is an area of east Manchester, England. Historically in Lancashire, it neighbours the district of Openshaw to the east. The River Medlock and the Ashton Canal both run through it.

History

Around 1200–1230 it was known as Bexwic and it is believed to be a combination of a personal name and a settlement or dwelling place. At the height of the Industrial Revolution there was less industry here than in Bradford and it was primarily a residential area of terraced houses.

In 2002, east Manchester was the focus of the XVII Commonwealth Games, which brought new development to the area including the City of Manchester Stadium, National Cycling Centre (Manchester Velodrome), English Institute of Sport, National Squash Centre, Regional Athletics Arena and Indoor Tennis Centre.

Governance

Beswick was the biggest township of the ancient parish of Manchester in Salford Hundred of the county of Lancashire. It became part of the Township of Manchester in 1838, being joined with Ardwick to form a Municipal Ward in the new township. For Poor Law purposes it was added to the Prestwich Poor Law Union, which was constituted by order of the Poor Law Board in 1850. In 1896, it was among the townships consolidated to form the Township of North Manchester for Poor Law purposes.

Gallery

References
There are many leisure activities and things to do near Beswick, Manchester. With an array of excellent sporting amenities, the proud legacy of the 2002 Commonwealth Games lives on in East Manchester.

Beswick boasts world-class sporting facilities which include the Etihad Stadium.

Beswick is also situated close to the National Squash Centre, the Manchester Regional Athletics Arena and the National Cycling Centre. A real hive of sporting activity – you’ll find sessions for all ages and abilities – at each of these centres.

The area is also home to East Manchester Academy, a mixed secondary school, which opened in 2010 and was built as part of the regeneration project. This wonderful, modern glass-fronted building also offers the well-equipped and welcoming Beswick Library.

Areas of Manchester